Luay al-Yassiry is an Iraqi politician who has been the Governor of Najaf since 2016.

References

Governors of Najaf Governorate
Iraqi politicians
People from Najaf
Iraqi Muslims
Living people
Year of birth missing (living people)